Naqshbandiyya Khalidiyya, Khalidiyya or Khalidi is the title of a branch of the Naqshbandiyya Sufi lineage, from the time of Khalid al-Baghdadi until the time of Shaykh Ismail ash-Shirwani.

The Khalid’îyyah tariqa silsila

References

 Gammer, Moshe. Muslim Resistance to the Tsar: Shamil and the Conquest of Chechnia and Daghestan. Portland, OR: Frank Cass, 1994.
 Shaykh Muhammad Hisham Kabbani, Classical Islam and the Naqshbandi Sufi Tradition, Islamic Supreme Council of America (June 2004), .

Further reading
 Bremer, Marie Luise (1959). Die Memoiren des türkischen Derwischs Asci Dede Ibrahim. Walldorf, Germany. (about Ibrahim Khalil, 1828 - c.1910).

Naqshbandi order